Bridgescape is an operator of alternative schools, sometimes referred to as dropout recovery schools, in the U.S. According to a ProPublica report, by 2013,  Bridgescape operated 17 schools in six states including "options" schools in Chicago, Illinois.

Bridgescape's website lists school locations in Florida, Indiana, and Ohio. The list of Florida schools appears to include several taken over from the troubled Mavericks High Schools program. In 2019, Bridgescape listed Road to Success Academy at 3377 Cleveland Avenue
Columbus, Ohio and Capital High School at 640 Harrisburg Pike in Columbus, Ohio; Bridgescape Learning Academy of Gary
At 730 W. 25th Avenue in Gary, Indiana; and six Florida schools mostly in Southeastern Florida and one in Kissimmee.

For-profit education company EdisonLearning's website includes a feature on Bridgescape students in Chicago visiting an FBI office in 2017 and also promoted Bridgescape on its website in September 2018.

Magic Johnson was involved in marketing Bridgescape schools.

References

Schools in Florida
Schools in Ohio
Special needs schools in Indiana
Alternative schools in the United States